Beni Salah (or other spelling variations) may refer to:

Bni Salah, a small town in Tangier-Tétouan region of Morocco
Bani Saleh Rural District, Khuzestan Province, Iran
Banū Salih rulers of the Kingdom of Nekor, in present-day Morocco
Beni Saleh tribe living near Blida in Algeria, speakers of Kabyle
Beni Salah mountain near Souk Ahras, Algeria

See also
Salah (name)
Hammam Béni Salah, a town and commune in El Taref Province, Algeria
Ibn al-Salah (1181 CE/577 AH – 1245/643)